Pishtachev Peak is the rocky, partly ice-free peak rising to 1283 m between Rozier Glacier and Blanchard Glacier on Danco Coast in Graham Land, Antarctica.

The feature is named after the Bulgarian cartographer Toma Pishtachev (1876-1955).

Location

British mapping in 1980.

Maps
 Antarctic Digital Database (ADD). Scale 1:250000 topographic map of Antarctica. Scientific Committee on Antarctic Research (SCAR). Since 1993, regularly upgraded and updated.

Notes

References
 Pishtachev Peak. SCAR Composite Antarctic Gazetteer.
 Bulgarian Antarctic Gazetteer. Antarctic Place-names Commission. (details in Bulgarian, basic data in English)

External links
 Pishtachev Peak. Copernix satellite image

Mountains of Graham Land
Danco Coast
Bulgaria and the Antarctic